Kim Hyun-mee (born 29 November 1962) is a South Korean politician previously served as the Minister of Land, Infrastructure and Transport (MOLIT) under President Moon Jae-in from 2017 to 2020. She is the first woman to lead this ministry since its creation in 1948.

She was the first chief of staff to then-party leader of Democratic Party, Moon Jae-in. She is also a three-term parliamentarian of the Democratic Party.

As of September 2019, Kim is leading one of three ministries which heads have not changed since the beginning of the Moon's presidency despite of several reshuffles until December 2020 when she and Park Neung-hoo's successors were nominated and later appointed.

She graduated from Yonsei University with a Bachelor of Arts in Political Science and Diplomacy.

Electoral history

References

External links 

Minister of Land, Infrastructure and Transport

Living people
Women government ministers of South Korea
Yonsei University alumni
1962 births
Minjoo Party of Korea politicians
Members of the National Assembly (South Korea)
Uri Party politicians
Housing ministers
Infrastructure ministers
Transport ministers
People from Jeongeup
Female members of the National Assembly (South Korea)